Greg Rawlinson (born 14 August 1978 in Durban, South Africa) is a New Zealand international rugby union player.
Rawlinson, who has made four appearances for the All Blacks, was born in South Africa and moved to New Zealand in 2002. The second row rejected overtures from the Springboks to remain in All Black contention and was rewarded with a call-up to face Ireland in June 2006. He became only the second ever South African-born All Black, the other being Andrew Mehrtens who was also born in Durban.

Rawlinson played for the Blues in Super Rugby and North Harbour Rugby Union in the Air New Zealand Cup, and has previously played for Bay of Plenty in the National Provincial Championship (NPC), the predecessor to the Air New Zealand Cup.

In 2005 he was named the North Harbour Player of the Year after playing in all 12 of North Harbour's matches that year.  In the same year he was named the Air New Zealand Cup Most Valuable Player.  He made his debut for the All Blacks in June 2006 against Ireland.

In 2007, New Zealand international Rawlinson moved to Worcester from Auckland Blues on a three-year deal during the summer, which will allow him to play in the Guinness Premiership.

In 2011, Greg left Worcester Warriors

References

External links
 
 Worcester Warriors Profile
 Guinness Premiership Profile at GuinnessPremiership.com

1978 births
Living people
Bay of Plenty rugby union players
Blues (Super Rugby) players
New Zealand international rugby union players
New Zealand rugby union players
North Harbour rugby union players
Rugby union locks
Rugby union players from Durban
Sharks (Currie Cup) players
Sharks (rugby union) players
South African emigrants to New Zealand
Worcester Warriors players